Winai Dahlan(born on 7 January 1952) is the Founder Director of the Halal Science Center Chulalongkorn University. He is also the Head of The Lipid and Fat Science Research as well as International Graduate Program Chair in Food and Nutrition, Faculty of Allied Health Sciences, Chulalongkorn University.

Dahlan was born to parents of Javanese descent in Bangkok. His father is Irfan Dahlan and his mother is Zahrah. His grandfather Ahmad Dahlan is National Hero of Indonesia. He is currently in the position of Associate professor of C9 level involving with scientific training. He has had many researches of more than 30 articles having been published both locally and internationally including scientific and nutrition articles of more than two thousand pieces and his writing in three Weekly Magazines since 1989. Winai Dahlan is one of “The World's 500 Most Influential Muslims

," for 14 consecutive years compiled by the Royal Islamic Strategic Studies Centre and the only Thai Muslim Scientist ranked in “The World’s 16 most Influential Muslim Scientists” in Science and Technology.

Education
Ph.D. Applied Medical Biology (grand distinction), Faculty of Medicine and Pharmacy, St-Pierre Hospital, Université Libre de Bruxelles, Brussels, Belgium, 1989
M.S. Nutrition, Faculty of Medicine Ramathibodi Hospital, Mahidol University, Bangkok, Thailand, 1982
B.Sc. Biochemistry, Faculty of Science, Chulalongkorn University, Bangkok, Thailand, 1976

Career

Lecturer, Chulalongkorn University, 1993-present
Founding Director, The Halal Science Center,  Chulalongkorn University, 2004-present
 Vice President, The Central Islamic Council of Thailand (CICOT), 2013-present
Chairman, The Halal Standard Institute of Thailand (HSIT), 2014-present
Member, The National Reform Committee on Social, 2017-present
Member, Thailand Halal Task Force (Ministry of Agricuture and Cooperatives), 2022
Member, Committee of Muslim-friendly tourism promotion (Ministry of Tourism and Sports), 2022

References

External links
Profile of Winai Dahlan
Board Of Halal Science Center
Halal Science Center News

Winai Dahlan
Winai Dahlan
Winai Dahlan
Winai Dahlan
Winai Dahlan
Winai Dahlan
Winai Dahlan
Living people
1952 births